Billietite is an uncommon mineral of uranium that contains barium.  It has the chemical formula: Ba(UO2)6O4(OH)6•8H2O. It usually occurs as clear yellow  orthorhombic crystals.  
Billietite is named after Valere Louis Billiet (1903–1945), Belgian crystallographer at the University of Ghent, Ghent, Belgium.

Billietite was discovered in the locality of the Shinkolobwe uranium mine in the Haut-Katanga Province of the Democratic Republic of the Congo (DRC).

References

External links
webmineral.com

Uranium(VI) minerals
Orthorhombic minerals
Minerals in space group 33